Inti Watana, Intiwatana (Quechua, hispanicized spelling Intihuatana) or Pumaqucha (Quechua puma cougar, puma, qucha lake, "puma lake", hispanicized spellings Pomaccocha, Pomacocha, Pumacocha) is an archaeological site in Peru. It is located in the Ayacucho Region, Vilcas Huamán Province, Vischongo District, at the lake Pumaqucha.

The site was declared a National Cultural Heritage of Peru by Resolución Directoral No. Nº 751/INC on July 27, 2001 .

See also 
 Usnu
 Titankayuq

References 

Archaeological sites in Peru
Archaeological sites in Ayacucho Region